Cepheuptychia is a genus of satyrid butterfly found in the Neotropical realm.

Species
Listed alphabetically:
Cepheuptychia angelica (Butler, 1874)
Cepheuptychia cephus (Fabricius, 1775)
Cepheuptychia glaucina (Bates, 1865)
Cepheuptychia romani (Aurivillius, 1929)

References

Euptychiina
Nymphalidae of South America
Butterfly genera
Taxa named by Walter Forster (entomologist)